Darfield is a town in the Selwyn District of the South Island of New Zealand. It is 35 kilometres west of the outskirts of Christchurch.

Darfield is the main town between Christchurch and the West Coast region. It is often called "The township under the nor'west arch" in reference to a characteristic weather phenomenon that often creates an arch of cloud in an otherwise clear sky to the west of the township. This is caused by the condensation of water particles channelled upwards over the Southern Alps / Kā Tiritiri o te Moana.

Darfield lies in the Malvern district's arable and pastoral farming area. It is a gateway to the scenic Waimakariri and Rakaia rivers and the Southern Alps, and is also a popular lift-off place for hot air ballooning.

Darfield is located around the former junction of the railway lines coming from Christchurch and going to Whitecliffs (where coal was mined) and Springfield and on to the West Coast.

History
Darfield was first known as White Cliffs Junction it was renamed in 1879 as Horndon Junction, which was changed to avoid confusion with Hornby [railway] Junction (close by in Christchurch).

Darfield acquired its name from John Jebson who named it after the village in Yorkshire, England. The name refers to a field frequented by deer.

A stone mill for grinding flour was built in 1887. It was powered by the Selwyn County Council's water race.

A magnitude 7.1 earthquake occurred near Darfield at 4:35 am on 4 September 2010, causing widespread damage to both the town and to surrounding areas including the city of Christchurch.

Fonterra invested $500 million in a milk processing plant which was opened in 2013 in Darfield. This includes the world's largest dryer which is used in the process to make instant wholemilk powder.

Climate
Located on the Canterbury Plains at an altitude of 193 metres (633 feet) above sea level, the Köppen-Geiger climate classification for Darfield is Cfb (Oceanic). On several days a year, Darfield is subject to the nor'west Foehn wind, which is very dry and has the capability to raise the temperature by several degrees per hour. On the contrary, the town is also susceptible to cold blasts from the Southern Ocean, especially during winter, when a southerly wind blows. The average annual temperature in Darfield is 11.6 °C (52.9 °F). The highest recorded temperature is 40.7 °C (105.3 °F), set on 8 February 1973, while the lowest recorded temperature is -8.0 °C (17.6 °F), set on 7 June 2012. The highest minimum temperature is 25.7 °C (78.3 °F), set on 6 February 2011, while the lowest maximum temperature is 0.6 °C (33.1 °F), set on 12 July 2017. On average, Darfield can expect to see 38.3 days of frost per year, and 49 days where the maximum temperature exceeds 26.7 °C (80 °F).

Demographics 

Darfield had a population of 2,724 at the 2018 New Zealand census, an increase of 327 people (13.6%) since the 2013 census, and an increase of 750 people (38.0%) since the 2006 census. There were 1,053 households. There were 1059 occupied private dwellings and a further 63 unoccupied private dwellings. There were 1,338 males and 1,389 females, giving a sex ratio of 0.96 males per female. The median age was 43.9 years (compared with 37.4 years nationally), with 507 people (18.6%) aged under 15 years, 435 (16.0%) aged 15 to 29, 1,218 (44.7%) aged 30 to 64, and 564 (20.7%) aged 65 or older.

Ethnicities were 94.6% European/Pākehā, 6.6% Māori, 1.4% Pacific peoples, 2.0% Asian, and 3.1% other ethnicities (totals add to more than 100% since people could identify with multiple ethnicities).

The proportion of people born overseas was 16.3%, compared with 27.1% nationally.

Although some people objected to giving their religion, 52.5% had no religion, 38.3% were Christian, 0.2% were Hindu, 0.2% were Muslim, 0.1% were Buddhist and 1.1% had other religions.

Of those at least 15 years old, 348 (15.7%) people had a bachelor or higher degree, and 462 (20.8%) people had no formal qualifications. The median income was $36,400 with 20.3% earning over $70,000, compared with a median income of  $31,800 nationally. The employment status of those at least 15 was that 1,146 (51.7%) people were employed full-time, 324 (14.6%) were part-time, and 39 (1.8%) were unemployed.

The population of Darfield was 830 people in 1971.

Education 

Darfield has numerous kindergartens. The original Darfield school was opened in 1883 with a total of 18 students attending. by 1902 the school had two teachers and ninety-three students children on the school roll.

Darfield Primary School is Darfield's sole primary school, catering for years 1 to 6. It has  students.

Darfield High School is Darfield's sole intermediate/highschool, catering for years 7 to 13. It has  students. The school was established in 1951 as a secondary school, and expanded to cover intermediate students in 1978.

Both schools are coeducational. Rolls are as of

Industry 
Many industries are present in Darfield, including brick-making, seed cleaning, and a Fonterra factory, which processes milk powder. The factory has a series of railway sidings and a container loading centre.

Services 
 
Darfield has a shopping precinct along the main street, including a Four Square supermarket. The town also has many churches, most notably St Joseph's Catholic Church and Trinity Church (Anglican, Methodist, Presbyterian). Darfield has two resthomes.

Other services include: a bakery, bank, cafés and bars, hotels, a library, motels, numerous petrol stations, a post office, and a veterinary clinic.

Darfield is also has a police, fire and ambulance stations, as well as a medical centre and a hospital.

Selwyn is not connected to a district wide sewage scheme. this necessitates all homes to have their own septic tanks.

Recreation 
Darfield has a domain, which includes duck ponds and the community centre. Football and rugby fields, tennis courts and a Scouts building are also located in the domain.

Westview Park is located in between the Midland railway line and State Highway 73 and to the west of Four Square Darfield. It boasts attractions such as the Whitecliffs Branch historical site and a skatepark.

McHughs Forest Park is located northwest of Darfield. It was planted in 1893 to provide timber for mid Canterbury. It contains a mix of Douglas Fir, Pinus Radiata, Macrocarpa, Larch, Spruce and other exotic species. There are a series of walking tracks within the forest.

Transport

Bus 
Darfield is serviced with the 86 bus route, a morning and evening express route that connects the town with Central Christchurch, via Kirwee, West Melton and Yaldhurst.

Rail 
Darfield is served by the Midland railway line. The TranzAlpine train stops twice daily (request only); en route to the West Coast and on its return trip back to Christchurch.

Road 

Notable people
 Sir Allan Wright (29 March 1929), President of Federated Farmers and first chancellor of Lincoln University.
 Geoff Wright (29 March 1929), New Zealand cricketer
 John Wright (5 July 1954), New Zealand cricketer and former coach of the Indian national cricket team
 Henry Shipley (10 May 10 1996), New Zealand cricketer
 Brian Connell (23 April 1956), politician
 Mary Clinton (8 May 1960), New Zealand field hockey player
 James Te Huna (29 September 1981), first New Zealander to enter the UFC, 2010 (Ultimate Fighting Championships)

Gallery

References

External links
Darfield on the Selwyn District Council website 

Selwyn District
Populated places in Canterbury, New Zealand